Shirabad (also Romanized as Shīrābād) is a village in Golshan Rural District, in the Central District of Tabas County, South Khorasan Province, Iran. At the 2006 census, its population was 332, in 86 families.

References 

Populated places in Tabas County